Firmin Flamand was a Belgian archer and Olympic champion. He competed at the 1920 Summer Olympics in Antwerp, where he won a gold medal with the Belgian team, and also an individual bronze medal.

References

Belgian male archers
Olympic archers of Belgium
Archers at the 1920 Summer Olympics
Olympic gold medalists for Belgium
Year of death missing
Olympic medalists in archery
Year of birth missing
Olympic bronze medalists for Belgium
Medalists at the 1920 Summer Olympics
20th-century Belgian people